Regiment University of Cape Town was an artillery regiment of the South African Army. As a reserve unit, it had a status roughly equivalent to that of a British Army Reserve or United States Army National Guard unit. It was part of the South African Army Artillery Corps.

History
By the 1950s, South Africa dedicated military units to each large university. The University of Cape Town was issued an anti-aircraft regiment transferred from the SA Marine Corps and composed of 51, 52 and 54 batteries known up to then as 4 Heavy Anti-Aircraft Regiment.

The idea was for students to honour their obligatory military training in such units. Training would also be organised so as not to disproportionately affect university work.

The Regiment's first deployment was during a State of Emergency in March and April 1960 where it was utilised as infantry outside townships around the Cape Peninsula.

Early in the 1960s,the Regiment moved from Youngsfield to its new headquarters at Wingfield.

Training
Until 1967, annual training lasted three weeks and was held at Eerste River while seaward gunnery practices were held at Strandfontein.

Equipment
The Regiment used the standard 3.7 inch gun was replaced by a 35mm anti-aircraft gun requiring a conversion camp was held in December 1969. A second conversion camp was held at Wingfield from 5–25 October 1973.

Regimental Command
 Commandant C.D. Stark 1960
 Commandant D.C. Robertson, JCD 1962 
 Commandant J.K. van der Merwe 1967
 Commandant F.T. Croswell 1970
 Commandant W. Bannatyne, JCD 1973
 Honorary Colonel: Maj the Hon P.V.G. van der Byl

Notable Members
Prof Maj. Christiaan Barnard was at one stage, the Regiments’ medical officer.

References

South African Army
Artillery regiments of South Africa
University of Cape Town
Military units and formations established in 1958
Military units and formations disestablished in 1968
1958 establishments in South Africa